The Australian Property Institute (API) is a professional industry body representing residential, commercial and plant and machinery valuers, analysts, fund managers and property lawyers.

The API was originally formed in 1926 as the Commonwealth Institute of Valuers. Many Australian financial institutions require property professionals who carry out mortgage valuation work to be members of the API.

The API provides certifications to its members reflecting their specific field of expertise. Such Certifications are required by some Australian States to practice in the specific field. These Certifications are:
 CPV, Certified Practising Valuer
 RPV, Residential Property Valuer
 CPP, Certified Property Professional
 CPM, Certified Property Manager
 CFM, Certified Funds Manager
 CPD, Certified Property Developer
 CFacM, Certified Facilities Manager
 CAM, Certified Asset Manager

API publications include The Australia & New Zealand Property Journal, the Professional Practice Manual and Valuation Principles and Practices.

Members of the Institute are bound by a code of ethics, rules of conduct, and professional practice standards. The API has reciprocity agreements with the following bodies
 The Appraisal Institute (USA)
 Property Institute of New Zealand
 Appraisal Institute of Canada 
 Hong Kong Institute of Surveyors (General Practice Division) 
 Property Institute of New Zealand  
 Royal Institution of Chartered Surveyors, United Kingdom (General Practice Division) 
 Singapore Institute of Surveyors and Valuers (General Practice Division)

These reciprocity agreements provide API members with portable skills and qualifications allowing them to practice throughout the world.

The National Office of the Australian Property Institute is located at 3/60 York Street, Sydney NSW 2000.

External links
 Australian Property Institute (Official site)
 Property Institute Member Directory

Organizations established in 1926
Business organisations based in Australia
Professional valuation organizations